Elections to the Kentucky Senate were held on November 8, 2022, as part of the biennial 2022 United States elections.

Predictions

Retirements

Democrats
District 10: Dennis Parrett retired.

Republicans
District 6: C. B. Embry retired.
District 8: Matt Castlen retired.
District 12: Alice Forgy Kerr retired.
District 20: Paul Hornback retired.
District 24: Wil Schroder retired.

Summary of results 

 NOTE: The 19 odd-numbered districts did not hold elections in 2022 so they are not listed here.

References

See also 

 Elections in Kentucky

Kentucky Senate
November 2022 events in the United States
Kentucky Senate elections
2022 Kentucky elections